Samuel or Sam Hope may refer to:

 Sam Hope (baseball player)
 Sam Hope (politician)
 Samuel Hope esq. of Everton, Liverpool, grandfather of Samuel Morley, 1st Baron Hollenden